Agnello of Naples or Aniello the Abbot (535, Naples - 14 December 596, Naples) was a Basilian and later Augustinian monk. He is venerated as a saint by the Roman Catholic Church, with a feast day on 14 December, the date of his death.

Life

The first major mention of Agnello is in the Libellus miraculorum, a 10th-century hagiography by Peter the Sub-Deacon. He was born in 535 in Naples into a rich family of Syracusan origin, possibly related to saint Lucy - his father was Federico and his mother Giovanna. He spent his youth as a hermit in a cave near a chapel dedicated to the Virgin Mary and then in the church of Santa Maria Intercede, which later became Sant'Agnello Maggiore. He received a wealthy inheritance on his parents' death and used it on works of charity, such as founding a hospital for poor people.

He became more and more popular among the inhabitants of Naples, so much so that they asked him to save the city during the Lombard invasion of 581 - he appeared carrying a banner of the cross to defend the city. He finally left the city to escape his popularity, moving to Monte Sant'Angelo then the village of Guarcino, where he remained seven years and where there is a shrine to him. He later returned to Naples to become an Augustinian monk and then a priest at the monastery of Gaudiosus of Naples, where he finally became abbot and where he died aged 61.

Cult
The liturgical commemoration occurred on December 14.

The seventeenth-century reliquary bust containing the jaw and throat attributed to Agnello is kept in the cathedral of Naples, inside the Chapel of San Gennaro. He is co-patron of the city of Naples where, according to tradition, he would be buried in the church of Sant'Agnello Maggiore in Caponapoli.

From the saint takes the name of Sant'Agnello a village on the Sorrento peninsula, where among other things there is a church dedicated to him and a statue in the homonymous square.

The popular cult is also found in two Campania proverbs regarding Saint Aniello: 'A sant'Aniello nun tucca' ne forbice 'e ne curtiello e A santa Lucia nu passe 'e gallina, a sant'Aniello nu passe 'e pecuriello' which translates to 'Sant'Aniello doesn't touch scissors or curtains and Santa Lucia doesn't pass the hen, Sant'Aniello doesn't pass the sheep'. The first refers to a custom in the area according to which pregnant women must not use knives or scissors, because the unborn child could be born mutilated in a limb. The second refers to the length of the day, in fact, according to tradition on December 13, the feast of Saint Lucia, the day gets longer a little, like a hen's step, the next day, the feast of Sant'Aniello, the day advances even more, like a sheep's step.

The cult is also widespread in Cilento, particularly in the town of Rodio, a fraction of the Municipality of Pisciotta, which also venerates it as its patron. On 30 July 2009, the bishop of Vallo della Lucania, Monsignor Giuseppe Rocco Favale, elevated the parish church of Rodio, built by the Knights of Malta in the 15th century, to the dignity of a diocesan sanctuary of Sant'Agnello abbot, particularly aimed at the defence and to the promotion of nascent life. Rodio celebrates Sant'Agnello three times during the year: May 31, a votive festival that commemorates the prodigious cessation of the rain that was destroying the vineyards; August 8, solemn feast, with the participation of pilgrims and emigrants and December 14, liturgical feast. From Rodio the devotion has spread to neighbouring countries that have made statues and celebrate feasts in honour of the holy abbot: Pisciotta (1891), Vallo della Lucania (early twentieth century), Pellare (thirties), Ascea and Ascea Marina (seventies). In 1979, the capital Pisciotta obtained from the competent Roman Congregation that, alongside the ancient protectors Santa Sofia and San Vito, Sant'Agnello was also proclaimed its patron, considered the great devotion of the people to this saint. In Pisciotta, Sant'Agnello is celebrated on 10 August and 14 December.

In Cilento, many bear the name of Aniello or Agnello, or the feminine Anella.

In Tramonti (SA), in the hamlet of Cesarano on the 14th day after the solemn evening mass, the holy procession of the sacred images of Saints Lucia and Aniello or Agnello takes place, up to the locality 'bont e cerz'.

Miracles attributed 
Some miracles are attributed to the saint:

 26 September 1904 n°42 - In May 1904, Giovanni Margherita, from Roccarainola but resident in America, felt severe pain in his right leg. The next day the doctor diagnosed sciatica and Margherita was admitted to a paid hospital. After 50 days, his conditions did not improve and while he was about to fall asleep the Holy Protector appeared to him and inspired him to invoke him; immediately he vowed to the saint to sing a mass and to send him a wax leg if he was healed. In the following days, the conditions improved until he recovered. When he left the hospital, he had sung mass celebrated on 10 July and on 10 September, instead of presenting the wax leg, he presented the Grand Protector with a silver leg engraved "GIOVANNI MARGHERITA PER GRAZIA OTTENUTA", which translates to "GIOVANNI MARGHERITA BY GRACE OBTAINED".
 28 November 1904 n°44 - Saverio De Bartolomeo in June 1904 was suffering from gastroenteritis, with fever, consecutive self-intoxication, and continuous diarrhoea. The devotee risked collapse and no experimental cure took effect. After 20 days he was about to go to a paid hospital, but his hotelier brought him an envelope sent by the promoting committee for the Patron Saint's Day, containing medals depicting the Madonna del Rosario on one side and the Saint on the other (it was the first time that the committee struck a medal). At that moment a friend arrived who made him drink an extract of melon and almonds, the sick man drank it holding the madagline in one hand. After drinking it, he felt invigorated, got up from bed with glee and walked around the house. When he left the hotel the following day, he immediately returned to Roccarainola where, with his wife and children, he thanked the patron saint.
 On October 14 of the same year - Teresa Miele from Roccarainola went to thank the Saint with a choir of maidens offering wax and holy mass for having cured her daughter of a puerperal fever that was causing her death.
 October 15th - Maria Saccomanno thanked the patron saint for making her first childbirth happy, as it was presenting itself very difficult.
 27 February 1905 n°27 - Nunzia Passariello di Cicciano, whose husband turned to the saint begging him to heal his right knee, gave the saint a pair of earrings upon receipt of the grace.
 Leopoldo Galeotta, resident of New York, - thanked the Wonderworker for 3 graces received: one for him who, thanks to the Saint, overcame a difficult appendix operation, the second thanks for the daughter who broke her leg in the lower third and recovered completely and the third for two girls who reduced to extremes for measles, pneumonia and typhoid fever. To thank the Saint, the Galeotta sent a silver leg and two little girls to the parish as a sign of devotion to the saint. 
 The spouses Mario Pinto and Bellonia Negra, - residents in Tresbar, Brazil, after having received the pardon from the Neapolitan Saint for having saved their seriously ill son, they send L.25.00 to the organizing committee and ask for prayers. 
 27 March 1905 n°48 - After giving birth, Angela Roselli di Tufino began to feel pain in her right breast and a high fever. After a few days, the breast reached a state of swelling for which the doctor requested surgery as soon as possible. Roselli's mother turned to the saint asking for the grace to heal her daughter without surgery and vowed to come and thank him with her daughter; already during the day the swelling began to disappear completely and the fever dropped to 37 degrees. After a few days, Roselli was perfectly healed.
 Bartolomeo D'Arienzo, - judicial auditor of the Court of Naples, together with his wife he wanted to thank the Wonderworker for various graces received, leaving alms for a plain mass.
 Caterina De Blasio, - to thank the saint for the birth, she left a ring as a gift.
 29 May 1905 n°50 - Agnello Grasso di Cicciano slaughtered an ox affected by carbuncle on 10 February, the next day he was seized with chills and a strong fever, and noticed a pustule on his right arm; after a few hours he saw the formation of other pustules near the first. The doctor diagnosed him with a malignant pustule and recommended hospitalization. Grasso went to the Incurables of Naples, but no treatment had any effect. The wealthy family decided to treat him at home and had him visited by two doctors twice a day, but the disease progressed and new pustules began to appear also in the other arm. The mother and daughter-in-law decided to go to the saint's feet to ask him for thanks and listened to the mass on their knees, promising the saint a sung mass and a silver child. A picture of the Protector was in the sick room. The next day when the doctors went to see him, they declared that the disease had lost its strength and Grasso received healing. On March 13, together with the bride and mother, they thanked the Saint.
 The presbyter Antonio De Ponte, - from Gargani but resident in New York, he sent alms from a devotee for a sung mass and the firing of 500 mortals to thank the abbot for various graces received. On May 20 the Mass was sung with the firing of mortals, the celebration was attended by 5 priests of the Clergy of Roccarainola, the Vicar Foraneo and a Canon of the distinguished Collegiate of Avella. 
 29 December 1905 n°57 - Rosina Vincenti resident in New York, thanked the patron saint for having cured her daughter, suffering from groin cancer.
 Vita Maria Gallo, - of Ariano di Puglia, thanked the Wonderworker for having cured her of a strong infectious fever that kept her in bed for 5 months.
 Antonetta De Stefano, - of Cicciano, being his sister Maria - resident in San Paolo (Brazil) - in danger of life for an abortion, he turned to the saint and the sick woman recovered her perfect health.

Bibliography (in Italian)
Alfredo Cattabiani, Santi d'Italia, Milano, Rizzoli, 1993, 
Piero Bargellini, Mille Santi del giorno, Vallecchi editore, 1977
Bonaventura Gargiulo, Il glorioso S. Agnello, abate: studio storico critico, con appendici, Stab. tip. librario A. e S. Festa, 1903
Anselmo Lettieri, S. Agnello Abate, il suo corpo e il suo culto in Lucca, La Tipografica di O. & E. Malanima, Lucca, 1948
 Andrea Manzo, Relazione Storica della parrocchia di Gargani e brevissima vita del Gran Patrono S. Agnello Abbate, Tipografia "Dante Alighieri, 1911

References

External links
https://web.archive.org/web/20160304094913/http://www.pisciotta.net/it/Festivita%60/S.Agnello%20Abate/calendario/la_vita_di_santagnello_abate.htm
http://www.santiebeati.it/dettaglio/81450

Italian abbots
Italian Christian monks
6th-century Christian saints
Italian Roman Catholic saints
Italian Roman Catholic priests
535 births
596 deaths
Religious leaders from Naples
Augustinian monks
Basilian saints